Association Sportive du Real Bamako, commonly referred to as Real Bamako is a Malian football club based in Bamako. They play in the Malian Première Division the top division in Malian football. Their home stadium is Stade Modibo Keïta.

Among Real Bamako's most successful players was Salif "Domingo" Keïta (1963–67), who went on to win three Championships and the Ballon d'Or Africain (1970) at Saint-Étienne in France.

Achievements

Malian Première Division: 6
1969, 1980, 1981, 1983, 1986, 1991

Malian Cup: 10
1962, 1964, 1966, 1967, 1968, 1969, 1980, 1989, 1991, 2010

Performance in CAF competitions

African Cup of Champions Clubs/CAF Champions League: 10 appearances
1966 – Finalist
1970 – Second Round
1981 – First Round
1982 – Quarter-finals
1984 – First Round
1987 – First Round
1992 – First Round
2014 – Second Round
2017 – Preliminary Round
2018 – Preliminary Round

CAF Confederation Cup: 3 appearances
2011 – Preliminary Round
2012 – Second Round
2014 – Group Stage (Top 8)

CAF Cup Winners' Cup: 2 appearances
1990 – First Round
1997 – First Round

Notable Former Players

References

External links
   AS REAL de Bamako : Une crise persistante. Sadou BOCOUM in Soir de Bamako  2007-12-03.

Bamako
Sport in Bamako
Association football clubs established in 1960
1960 establishments in Mali